Hetrodes is a genus of South African Orthopterans, typical of the subfamily Hetrodinae, erected by Fischer von Waldheim in 1833.   It is a monotypic genus and currently the sole representative of  the tribe Hetrodini Brunner von Wattenwyl, 1878.

Species and subspecies 
The Orthoptera Species File lists the single species  Hetrodes pupus (Linnaeus, 1758) and the following subspecies:
 H. pupus abbreviatus Walker, 1869
 H. pupus marginatus Walker, 1869
 H. pupus namaqua Péringuey, 1916
 H. pupus pupus <small>(Linnaeus, 1758) – type (described as Gryllus pupus Linnaeus)

References

External links 

Orthoptera of Africa
Ensifera genera
Tettigoniinae
Monotypic Orthoptera genera